The Sengjia Bridge is a historic stone bridge over the Longxi Stream in , Deqing County, Zhejiang, China.

History
Sengjia Bridge was first built in 743 during the Tang dynasty (618–907), and was rebuilt in 1226 during the reign of Emperor Lizong of the Song dynasty (960–1279).

In March 2005, it has been inscribed as a provincial-level cultural heritage site by the Government of Zhejiang.

Gallery

References

Deqing County, Zhejiang
Bridges in Zhejiang
Song dynasty architecture
Buildings and structures completed in 1226